Greever is a surname. Notable people with the surname include:

Paul Greever (1891–1943), American member of U.S. Congress from Wyoming
Tom Greever, author of Articulating Design Decisions
William S. Greever (1916–2007), American professor of history

See also
Grever